Kling is a surname.

Geographical distribution
As of 2014, 40.2% of all known bearers of the surname Kling were residents of Germany (frequency 1:6,549), 33.3% of the United States (1:35,616), 7.4% of Sweden (1:4,371), 4.0% of France (1:54,920), 2.8% of Russia (1:168,564), 2.3% of Brazil (1:295,111), 1.6% of the Netherlands (1:35,243) and 1.0% of Argentina (1:136,126).

In Sweden, the frequency of the surname was higher than national average (1:4,371) in the following counties:
 1. Kalmar County (1:2,129)
 2. Jönköping County (1:2,389)
 3. Gävleborg County (1:2,569)
 4. Västra Götaland County (1:3,110)
 5. Östergötland County (1:3,290)
 6. Dalarna County (1:3,331)
 7. Örebro County (1:3,478)
 8. Värmland County (1:3,963)

In Germany, the frequency of the surname was higher than national average (1:6,549) in the following states:
 1. Baden-Württemberg (1:2,661)
 2. Hesse (1:3,126)
 3. Rhineland-Palatinate (1:4,661)
 4. Bavaria (1:4,839)

People
Anja Kling (born 1970), German actress
Arnold Kling (born 1954), American economist and blogger
Catherine Kling (born 1960), American economist
Florence Kling, maiden name of Florence Harding (1860-1924), wife of US President Warren G. Harding
Heinrich Kling (1913-1951), German World War II Waffen SS officer
Johan Kling (born 1962), Swedish film director, screenwriter and novelist
Johnny Kling (1875-1947), American baseball catcher
Bill Kling (1867-1934), American baseball pitcher
Josef Kling (1811-1876), German chess master
Karl Kling (1910-2003), German motor racing driver and manager
Måns Nilsson Kling, governor of the 17th century colony of New Sweden
Marc-Uwe Kling (born 1982), German cabaret artist, author and songwriter
Ricky Kling (born 1987), Swedish motorcycle speedway rider
Robert Kling, alias used by Timothy McVeigh (1968-2001), American domestic terrorist
Robert Kling (born 1997), Norwegian footballer
Stephan Kling (born 1981), German footballer
Thomas Kling (1957-2005), German poet
Vincent Kling (architect) (1916–2013), American architect 
Vincent Kling (translator) (fl. from 1990), American scholar and translator of German literature
Wilhelm Kling (1902-1973), Communist Party of Germany and Socialist Unity Party functionary
William Hugh Kling (born 1942), American businessman, created Minnesota Public Radio
Woody Kling (1925-1998), American television writer and producer

Other uses
Kling or Keling, a term for Malaysians, Indonesians or Singaporeans of Indian descent
Upper Cross Street, Singapore, also known as Kling Street due to Indian traders living in the area
Mount Kling, South Georgia, Atlantic Ocean
Klings

See also
Klingons

References

German-language surnames
Swedish-language surnames